في الفيسبوك

In taxonomy, Rhodobacter is a genus of the Rhodobacteraceae. The most famous species of Rhodobacter are Rhodobacter sphaeroides and Rhodobacter capsulatus, which are used as model organisms to study bacterial photosynthesis.

References

External links

Rhodobacteraceae
Bacteria genera